Latorre is a locality located in the municipality of Aínsa-Sobrarbe, in Huesca province, Aragon, Spain. As of 2020, it has a population of 4.

Geography 
Latorre is located 102km east-northeast of Huesca.

References

Populated places in the Province of Huesca